Red Mountain is a mountain located in the Catskill Mountains of New York south-southwest of Grand Gorge. White Man Mountain is located northeast of Red Mountain and Cator Roundtop is located southwest.

References

Mountains of Delaware County, New York
Mountains of New York (state)